The Present Lover is a 2004 album by Luomo, his second under the alias. It was proceeded by the 12" single "Diskonize Me"/"Body Speaking." Compared to its predecessor Vocalcity (2000), the album emphasizes pop-oriented vocals and less spacious production.

Reviews
AllMusic described the album's style as "an opulent, full-bodied sound; aided by a broader palette of rhythms and starring roles from male and female vocalists," concluding that it "only cements the man's status as some sort of Nordic deity." Pitchfork stated that following its predecessor, the album "continues the experiment, and in general improves on it," while also noting cautiously that the vocals are "reminiscent of thousands of faceless lounge and downtempo compilations featuring "soulful divas" and androgynous emoting."

Track listing
 Visitor – 4:13
 Talk In Danger – 7:46
 The Present Lover – 9:19
 Body Speaking – 8:09
 So You – 6:06
 Could Be Like This – 8:12
 Cold Lately – 4:45
 Tessio – 9:25
 What Good – 8:16
 Shelter – 8:54

References

2004 albums
Vladislav Delay albums
Kinetic Records albums